August Kiuru (12 July 1922, Sakkola – 23 February 2009) was a Finnish cross-country skier who competed in the late 1940s and early 1950s. He won two silver medals in the 4 × 10 km relay at the 1948 Winter Olympics and the 1956 Winter Olympics.

Kiuru also won three medals in the FIS Nordic World Ski Championships with a gold in the 4 × 10 km relay (1954), a silver in the 4 × 10 km relay (1950) and a bronze in the 15 km (1954).

Cross-country skiing results
All results are sourced from the International Ski Federation (FIS).

Olympic Games
 2 medals – (2 silver)

World Championships
 3 medals – (1 gold, 1 silver, 1 bronze)

References

External links
 
 

1922 births
2009 deaths
People from Priozersky District
Finnish male cross-country skiers
Cross-country skiers at the 1948 Winter Olympics
Cross-country skiers at the 1956 Winter Olympics
Olympic medalists in cross-country skiing
FIS Nordic World Ski Championships medalists in cross-country skiing
Medalists at the 1948 Winter Olympics
Medalists at the 1956 Winter Olympics
Olympic silver medalists for Finland